Ventrone is a surname. Notable people with the surname include:

Ray Ventrone (born 1982), American football player
Ross Ventrone (born 1986), American football player